Vic Albury (1947–2017), Major League Baseball pitcher
 Bronson Arroyo (born 1977), MLB baseball player
 John James Audubon (1785–1851), naturalist, painter, ornithologist
 Elizabeth Bishop (1911–1979), poet, short-story writer
 Jimmy Buffett (born 1946), singer-songwriter, musician, author, actor, businessman
 Truman Capote (1924–1984), novelist, screenwriter, playwright, actor 
 Eric Carle (1929–2021), children's book author and illustrator most famous for The Very Hungry Caterpillar
 David Allan Coe (born 1939), musician
 Tom Corcoran, author
 Sandy Cornish (1793–1869), farmer, businessperson, civic leader, former slave
 Paul Cotton (1943–2021), musician
 John Dewey (1859–1952), philosopher, educational reformer, psychologist
 John Dos Passos (1896–1970), novelist
 Stepin Fetchit (1902–1985), vaudevillian, comedian, film actor
 Mel Fisher (1922–1998), treasure hunter, best known for finding the 1622 wreck of the Nuestra Señora de Atocha
 Robert Fuller (born 1933), actor
 Khalil Greene (born 1979), MLB shortstop
 Ernest Hemingway (1899–1961), novelist, short-story writer, journalist, sportsman
 Winslow Homer (1836–1910), landscape painter, printmaker 
 Mike Leach (1961-2022), college football coach 
 Alison Lurie (1926–2020), Pulitzer Prize-winning novelist, academic
 Stephen Mallory (1812–1873), U.S. senator
 James Merrill (1926–1995), Pulitzer Prize-winning poet
 George Mira (born 1942), football player
 Diana Nyad (born 1949), author, journalist, motivational speaker, long-distance swimmer; famous for being the first person to swim from Cuba to Key West, FL without the aid of a shark cage
Bettie Page (1923–2008), pin-up model
 John Patterson (born 1967), MLB second baseman
 Quincy Perkins (born 1980), filmmaker
 Boog Powell (born 1941), baseball player
 David Robinson (born 1965), basketball player
 Thomas Sanchez (born 1943), author
 Shel Silverstein (1930–1999), author, cartoonist and musician 
 Shane Spencer (born 1972), MLB outfielder
 Randy Sterling (born 1951), MLB pitcher
 Wallace Stevens (1879–1955), Pulitzer Prize-winning poet
 Keith Strickland (born 1953), musician, songwriter, founding member of The B-52s
 Michel Tremblay (born 1942), Canadian playwright
 Harry S. Truman (1884–1972), U.S. president
 Blake R. Van Leer (1893–1956), orphan who became the fifth president of Georgia Institute of Technology, colonel, inventor
 Dick Vermeil (born 1936), former Super Bowl Champion NFL Coach
 Tennessee Williams (1911–1983), author
 Tony White (born 1979), defensive coordinator for the Nebraska Cornhuskers
 David Wolkowsky (1919–2018), real estate developer, preservationist
 Stuart Woods (born 1938), novelist

References

Key West
Key West
People from Florida